Edward Besford (28 June 1915 – 12 July 1978) was an Australian rules footballer who played with Fitzroy in the Victorian Football League (VFL).

Family
The son of David Besford (1897-1990), and Rhoda Besford (1896-1974), née Websell, Edward Besford was born in Northumberland, England on 28 June 1915. He emigrated to Australia with his family at age 10, initially settling in Wonthaggi.

He married Mavis Jenkins (1917-), at North Fitzroy on 13 December 1941.

Cricket
He also played over 100 games of district cricket with Fitzroy and Carlton from 1937 to 1953.

Football
He was cleared to Carlton from Fitzroy in July 1945.

Notes

References

External links 

1915 births
1978 deaths
Sportspeople from Northumberland
VFL/AFL players born in England
Australian rules footballers from Victoria (Australia)
Fitzroy Football Club players
English emigrants to Australia